OHG may refer to:

 Oddset Hockey Games, an annual ice hockey event held in Sweden
 Old High German, the earliest stage of the German language, from around 500 to 1050 AD
 offene Handelsgesellschaft, a type of business entity in Germany, equivalent to a general partnership